Das Sacher: In Bester Gesellschaft (The Hotel Sacher: In Good Company) is an Austrian-German historical drama television series aired in two parts, directed by Robert Dornhelm and written by Rodica Doehnert, and based on the book Das Sacher. Geschichte einer Verführung The series was commissioned by the ORF (broadcaster) and ZDF. The first part was aired on December 27, 2016 on ORF2.

The series, is set in the city of Vienna around 1900, it tells the story of Anna Sacher, the widow of Eduard Sacher, who was the founder and owner of the Hotel Sacher, home of the sachertorte. Eduard was the son of Franz Sacher, inventor of the famous Sachertorte. The story begins with Eduard’s death and Anna’s tough decision to take over the management of the Hotel. The series is based on real events of the time and also on the life of Anna Sacher and mixes them with fictional stories of the upper and lower classes.

Plot 

When Anna has to fight for her rights in court, she shows perfect skills for managing such challenges by acting in an authoritative manner, networking and pulling strings in order to succeed. At the same time, in the catacombs of the nearby opera, Marie, the illegitimate daughter of a hotel laundress, is kidnapped. Despite Anna being informed about this tragedy by the police, her daily routines continue uninterrupted.

At the lobby of the hotel, the young Princess Konstanze von Traunstein meets the publisher Martha Aderhold from Berlin. The friendship of the two women soon falters, as does Konstanze's double life as a best-selling author, when she begins an affair with Martha's husband, the unsuccessful writer Maximilian.

In addition, a dark secret of the family of Traunstein threatens to come to light when the young Marie returns unannounced. During this time Anna Sacher meets the legendary "Haus Österreich" at her hotel and gains more and more social influence, but the outbreak of the First World War will change their lives and that of their guests forever.

References

External links
 Hotel Sacher
 

Austrian television series
2010s Austrian television series
2016 Austrian television series debuts
2016 Austrian television series endings
Austrian drama television series
Austrian television miniseries
2017 German television series debuts
2017 German television series endings
ORF (broadcaster) original programming
ZDF original programming
German-language television shows
2010s German television miniseries
Films directed by Robert Dornhelm